The Hedgehog Review is an interdisciplinary academic journal published triannually by the Institute for Advanced Studies in Culture (IASC) at the University of Virginia.

The journal features critical writing about cultural identity, citizenship, cultural change, and cultural diversity. Each issue adopts a theme, which the articles address in the form of essays, interviews, annotated bibliographies, and the like.

The Greek lyricist Archilochus provided the inspiration for the name of the journal, when he wrote this aphorism: "The fox knows many things, but the hedgehog knows one big thing." Part of the journal's mission statement is to strive "for both the breadth of the fox and the depth of the hedgehog."

External links
Institute for Advanced Studies in Culture

English-language journals
Triannual journals
University of Virginia
Cultural journals
1999 establishments in Virginia
Magazines published in Virginia